A våg (plural våger) or vog is an old Scandinavian unit of mass. 

The våg was used in Eastern Norway, Western Norway, and Northern Norway, but it varied in weight.

References

Further reading
 Språkrådet: Åtte potter rømme, fire merker smør – Om gammalt mål og gammal vekt I. Språknytt 4 (2006). 

Units of mass
Obsolete units of measurement